In probability and statistics, the reciprocal distribution, also known as the log-uniform distribution, is a continuous probability distribution. It is characterised by its probability density function, within the support of the distribution, being proportional to the reciprocal of the variable.

The reciprocal distribution is an example of an inverse distribution, and the reciprocal (inverse) of a random variable with a reciprocal distribution itself has a reciprocal distribution.

Definition

The probability density function (pdf) of the reciprocal distribution is

 

The cumulative distribution function is

Characterization

Relationship between the log-uniform and the uniform distribution 

A positive random variable X is log-uniformly distributed if the logarithm of X is uniform distributed,

This relationship is true regardless of the base of the logarithmic or exponential function.

Applications

The reciprocal distribution is of considerable importance in numerical analysis, because a computer’s arithmetic operations transform mantissas with initial arbitrary distributions into the reciprocal distribution as a limiting distribution.

References

Continuous distributions